"The First Night" is a song by American singer Monica for her second studio album, The Boy Is Mine (1998). It was written by Tamara Savage and Jermaine Dupri, featuring production and additional vocals from the latter. Built around a sample of Diana Ross's 1976 recording "Love Hangover", penned by Marilyn McLeod and Pam Sawyer, who share co-writing credits, the song is about the protagonist's battle with sexual temptations on the night of her first date, despite her conflicting emotions and strong sexual desires.

Following the major commercial chart success of previous single "The Boy Is Mine", a duet with fellow R&B singer Brandy, "The First Night" song was released on July 28, 1998, as the album's second single by Arista Records. Upon its commercial release, it emerged as Monica's second consecutive chart topper, topping both the US Billboard Hot 100 and the component Hot R&B/Hip-Hop Singles & Tracks chart, becoming her first Hot 100 number one (and third R&B number one) as a solo artist. A remix version with producer Dupri, and rapper Da Brat appeared as a bonus track on Monica's 1998 CD single, "Angel of Mine".

Background and development
"The First Night" was written by Tamara Savage and record producer Jermaine Dupri, and production was handled by the latter. In the mid-1990s, Savage, a USC alumna and musical performer, signed a development deal with EMI while she was still in college. In 1997, her mentor, Big Jon Platt, then Senior Vice President of Creative at EMI Music Publishing, started setting up collaborations between her and EMI writers such as Soulshock & Karlin and Jermaine Dupri. EMI flew Savage to Atlanta to co-write a song with Dupri for the South Park: Bigger, Longer & Uncut soundtrack, which was expected to be recorded by singer Janet Jackson, but when Savage began working with Dupri, they decided to focus first on writing a song for Monica, which resulted in "The First Night".

The song samples the dark, bassy piano chords intro section from American singer Diana Ross's "Love Hangover" (1976). Due to its sampling, "Love Hangover" writers Marilyn McLeod and Pam Sawyer are credited as co-writers. Recording of "The First Night" took place at the Krosswire Studios in Atlanta, and mixing was overseen by Phil Tan and Durpi at the Silent Sound Studios. Dupri performs several ad-libs on "The First Night" but is not placed as a featured artist on the track. Monica commented about the song in a 1998 interview with MTV News: "'The First Night' is not an experience of mine, but it's a record that Jermaine Dupri produced, and of whom I've known a long time...It is basically about a guy making an approach towards a woman on the first date."

Chart performance
"The First Night" became Monica's sixth top ten entry and second consecutive number-one hit on the US Billboard Hot 100, reaching the top of the charts in the week of October 3, 1998. It replaced "I Don't Want to Miss a Thing" by Aerosmith which had held the top spot from September 5 to September 26, and followed Monica's first chart topper "The Boy Is Mine" (1998), her duet with Brandy. "The First Night" was replaced by Barenaked Ladies's "One Week" after two weeks at number one, only to reclaim the top of the charts for another three weeks in October 1998. On Billboards component charts, it spent six weeks at number-one on the Hot R&B/Hip-Hop Singles & Tracks and became Monica's first entry on the Dance Club Songs chart, also reaching the top spot.

Internationally, "The First Night" was less successful though it still ranks among Monica's highest and latest-charting singles to date. It reached top ten of the singles charts in Canada, the United Kingdom, and Flemish region of Belgium, while entering the top 20 in New Zealand, and the top 30 in Australia, Iceland, Ireland, the Netherlands, and Scotland, as well as on a composite European Hot 100 Singles chart. In the United Kingdom, the song became her second chart topper on the UK R&B Singles. In Canada, it also peaked at number 15 on RPMs Dance/Urban chart.

With sales in excess of 1.0 million copies and a 20 week-stay in the top 40 of the Billboard Hot 100, "The First Night" was certified platinum by the Recording Industry Association of America (RIAA).Billboard ranked it 18th on its Hot 100 year-end listing and 19th on its Hot R&B/Hip-Hop Singles & Tracks year-end chart. In 1999, it finished 26 on Billboards Hot 100 decade-end chart. In 2018, the magazine ranked it 361th on its 60th Anniversary all-time chart.

Music video

Monica reteamed with "The Boy Is Mine" director Joseph Kahn to produce a music video for "The First Night." Filming took place in the Bradbury Building in downtown Los Angeles, California, a five-story office building that is best known for its extraordinary skylit atrium of access walkways, stairs and elevators, and their ornate ironwork.

In the video, Monica is seen dancing in a tight, white top and long khaki pants with a crowd of dancers. Throughout the video, there are cuts of her standing up in a white dress and sitting down on a long couch, holding golden opera glasses. Other cuts show groups of men and women as well as  Monica and her love interest sitting on a couch. The instrumental break features breakdancing then cuts back to the dance with the crowd. The video ends with Monica rejecting her lover's kiss.

In 2017, Complex magazine included the video on its The Best R&B Videos of the '90s listing and wrote: "Monica isn't going to have sex with you right away, and her method of letting you will be elaborate. Hence, this video...The dance moves were cute, the concept was simple, and it all came together perfectly in front of the camera."

Track listings

Credits and personnel
Credits are adapted from the liner notes of The Boy Is Mine.

 Monica Arnold – vocals
 Jermaine Dupri – mixing, production, writer
 Brian Frye – recording
 Marilyn McLeod – writer

 Tamara Savage – writer
 Pam Sawyer – writer
 Phil Tan – mixing

Charts

Weekly charts

Year-end charts

Decade-end charts

All-time charts

Certifications

Release history

See also
 List of Hot 100 number-one singles of 1998 (U.S.)
 List of number-one R&B singles of 1998 (U.S.)
 List of number-one dance singles of 1998 (U.S.)

References

External links
 Monica.com – official Monica site

1998 singles
Arista Records singles
Bertelsmann Music Group singles
Billboard Hot 100 number-one singles
Monica (singer) songs
Music videos directed by Joseph Kahn
Songs written by Jermaine Dupri
Songs written by Pam Sawyer
Songs written by Tamara Savage
Song recordings produced by Jermaine Dupri